The National Union of Congolese Workers (UNTC), (previously known as the Union Nationale des Travailleurs du Zaire (UNTZa)) is the largest trade union centre in the Democratic Republic of the Congo.

Founded in 1967, the UNTZa was the sole trade union centre in Zaire. By 1990 the union expelled its general secretary, Komdo Ntonga Booke, a member of the party central committee, and broke away from its close ties with the government. This came after the steady decline of workers purchasing power in the late 1980s.

In 1997 the union was renamed the UNTC, reflecting the renaming of Zaire to the Democratic Republic of the Congo.

References

External links
 www.untc.org

Trade unions in the Democratic Republic of the Congo
International Trade Union Confederation
Organisation of African Trade Union Unity
Kinshasa
Trade unions established in 1967